Eric George Barber (22 July 1915 – 30 April 1995) was an English cricketer.  Barber was a right-handed batsman.  He was born at Bishopsgate Green, Warwickshire.

Barber made two first-class appearances for Warwickshire against Derbyshire and Leicestershire in the 1936 County Championship.  Against Derbyshire, Barber was dismissed for 13 in Warwickshire's first-innings by Leslie Townsend, with Warwickshire making 109 all out in response to Derbyshire's first-innings total of 318.  Warwickshire were forced to follow-on in their second-innings, with Barber scoring 9 runs before he was again dismissed by Townsend.  Warwickshire could only manage a total of 199, which gave Derbyshire victory by an innings and 10 runs.  Against Leicestershire, Barber was dismissed by Ewart Astill for 9 runs in Warwickshire's first-innings total of 266, made in response to Leicestershire's first-innings total of 288.  Leicestershire made 102/5 in their second-innings, with the match ending in a draw.  These were his only major appearances for Warwickshire.

He died at Coventry, Warwickshire on 30 April 1995.

References

External links
Eric Barber at CricketArchive

1915 births
1995 deaths
Cricketers from Coventry
English cricketers
Warwickshire cricketers